According to the United States Department of Defense, it held more than two hundred Afghan detainees in Guantanamo prior to May 15, 2006. They had been captured and classified as enemy combatants in warfare following the US and allies' invasion of Afghanistan to overthrow the Taliban and disrupt terrorist networks. Originally, the US held such prisoners in sites in Afghanistan, but needed a facility to detain them where they could be interrogated. It opened the Guantanamo Bay detention camp on January 11, 2002, and transported the enemy combatants there.

The United States Supreme Court's ruled in Rasul v. Bush (2004) that the detainees had the right of habeas corpus to challenge their detention under the US Constitution. That summer, the Department of Defense stopped transferring detained men to Guantanamo. On September 6, 2006, United States President George W. Bush announced the transfer of 14 high value detainees to Guantanamo, including several Afghans. Other Afghans have been transferred to the camp since then.

List of individuals

See also
Timeline of the release and transfer of Guantanamo Bay detainees

References

External links
 Human Rights First blog: Military Commissions
 Human Rights First; Guantánamo by the Numbers (2010)

Afghan
Afghanistan–United States relations